Maryland Route 520 (MD 520) is a state highway in the U.S. state of Maryland.  Known as Whites Neck Road, the state highway runs  from a dead end at a boat ramp north to MD 239 near Bushwood in western St. Mary's County.  MD 520 was constructed in 1933.

Route description

MD 520 begins at a boat ramp at the southern end of Whites Neck adjacent to the mouth of Whites Neck Creek at St. Catherine Sound, an embayment of the Wicomico River. MD 520 veers northeast through a forested area before crossing Whites Neck Creek and reaching its northern terminus at MD 239 (Bushwood Wharf Road) near the community of Bushwood.

History
MD 520 was constructed as a gravel road in 1933.  The state highway was widened and resurfaced with bituminous concrete in 1956.  MD 520 has changed very little since then.

Junction list

See also

References

External links

MDRoads: MD 520

520
Maryland Route 520